Portrait of Clemenceau is an 1872 painting by Édouard Manet of the French statesman Georges Clemenceau in the Kimbell Art Museum in Fort Worth, Texas.

Manet's youngest brother Gustave was a municipal councillor in Paris and it may have been through his mediation that Manet met Clemenceau. Alternatively, the pair may have met at the home of Paul Meurice or Émile Zola.

The portrait was produced at the tribune of the Jardin du Luxembourg, where the city council was sitting; it is sometimes entitled Portrait of Clemenceau at the Tribune. Less realist than the later work of the same title, it stayed in the artist's studio for a long period.

References

Bibliography
 
 Adolphe Tabarant, Manet et ses œuvres, Paris, Gallimard, 1947, p. 600
 Étienne Moreau-Nélaton, Manet raconté par lui-même, vol. 2, t. I, Paris, Henri Laurens, 1926

Clemenceau
1872 paintings
Clemenceau
Clemenceau
Georges Clemenceau
Paintings in the collection of the Kimbell Art Museum